Phillip Terry Henderson (April 17, 1968 – February 17, 2013) was an American basketball player.  He was best known for his collegiate career at Duke University, where he led the Blue Devils to three consecutive NCAA Final Four appearances. He was a second round pick of the Dallas Mavericks in the 1990 NBA draft, but never played in the NBA.

Henderson was a McDonald's All-American high school player at Crete-Monee High School in Crete, Illinois.  He played for Hall of Fame coach Mike Krzyzewski at Duke, where he was a key player on three Final Four teams from 1988 to 1990.  His most successful season was as a senior in 1989–90 as he averaged 18.5 points per game to lead the team and was named second team All-Atlantic Coast Conference and team MVP.  He scored 1,397 points in his college career.

After college, Henderson was drafted in the second round of the 1990 NBA Draft by the Mavericks, but did not make the team.  He played in Belgium and Mexico, as well as several years in the Continental Basketball Association (CBA).  In parts of five seasons in the CBA, Henderson averaged 12.7 points and 2.5 rebounds per game.

Henderson retired from basketball in 1995 and moved to the Philippines to become a youth basketball coach.  He died of a heart attack in his home there on February 17, 2013.

References

External links
College stats

1968 births
2013 deaths
American expatriate basketball people in Belgium
American expatriate basketball people in Mexico
American expatriate basketball people in the Philippines
American men's basketball players
Basketball players from Chicago
Dallas Mavericks draft picks
Duke Blue Devils men's basketball players
Fargo-Moorhead Fever players
McDonald's High School All-Americans
Parade High School All-Americans (boys' basketball)
Quad City Thunder players
Shooting guards
Sioux Falls Skyforce (CBA) players
Tri-City Chinook players